Ayacara Airport is an airport serving Ayacara (es), a coastal village in the Los Lagos Region of Chile.

The airport and village are on the Ayacara Peninsula, at the end of Ayacara Cove, an inlet off the Gulf of Ancud. South approach and departures follow along the shoreline.

See also

Transport in Chile
List of airports in Chile

References

External links
OpenStreetMap - Ayacara
OurAirports - Ayacara
FallingRain - Ayacara Airport

Airports in Los Lagos Region